Russia competed at the 2016 Winter Youth Olympics in Lillehammer, Norway from 12 to 21 February 2016. The Russian Olympic Committee revealed the team on 28 January 2016.

Medalists

|width="30%" align=left valign=top|

Medalists in mixed NOCs events

Alpine skiing

Boys

Girls

Parallel mixed team

Biathlon

Boys

Girls

Mixed

Bobsleigh

Cross-country skiing

Boys

Girls

Curling

Mixed team

Team
Maria Arkhipova
German Doronin
Nadezhda Karelina
Sergei Maksimov

Round Robin

Draw 1

Draw 2

Draw 3

Draw 4

Draw 5

Draw 6

Draw 7

Quarterfinals

Semifinals

Bronze Medal Game

Mixed doubles

Figure skating

Singles

Couples

Mixed NOC team trophy

Freestyle skiing

Halfpipe

Ski cross

Slopestyle

Ice hockey

Boys' tournament

Roster

 Gleb Babintsev
 Maxim Denezhkin
 Grigori Denisenko
 Georgi Dubrovski
 Alexander Khovanov
 Vladislav Kotkov
 Pavel Kupchikhin
 Anton Malyshev
 Amir Miftakhov
 Kirill Nizhnikov
 Pavel Rotenberg
 Ilyas Sitdikov
 Yegor Sokolov
 Andrei Svechnikov
 Alexander Zhabreyev
 Bogdan Zhilyakov
 Danil Zhuravlyov

Group Stage

Semifinals

Bronze medal game

Final Rank:

Luge

Individual sleds

Mixed team relay

Nordic combined 

Individual

Nordic mixed team

Short track speed skating

Boys

Girls

Mixed team relay

Qualification Legend: FA=Final A (medal); FB=Final B (non-medal); FC=Final C (non-medal); FD=Final D (non-medal); SA/B=Semifinals A/B; SC/D=Semifinals C/D; ADV=Advanced to Next Round; PEN=Penalized

Skeleton

Ski jumping 

Individual

Team

Snowboarding

Snowboard cross

Slopestyle

Snowboard and ski cross relay

Qualification legend: FA – Qualify to medal round; FB – Qualify to consolation round

Speed skating

Boys

Girls

Mixed team sprint

See also
Russia at the 2016 Summer Olympics

References

2016 in Russian sport
Nations at the 2016 Winter Youth Olympics
Russia at the Youth Olympics